Jacques Destoop (17 June 1931 – 6 June 2022) was a French actor and painter.

Biography
He was a Sociétaires of the Comédie-Française who attended CNSAD and was married to actress Geneviève Fontanel.

Outside of his acting career, Destoop was steeped in the art of painting. He first began exhibiting his works in 1990 at the Galerie Gérard Rambaud in Paris. His paintings were inspired by the roles he played on stage, such as Cyrano de Bergerac.

Sound recordings
Les Chimères (1962)

Filmography

Cinema
 (1965)
Bye bye, Barbara (1969)
 (1973)

Television
 (1966)
 (1972)
 (1980)

References

1931 births
2022 deaths
20th-century French male actors
French male painters
Artists from Paris
Male actors from Paris
Sociétaires of the Comédie-Française
French National Academy of Dramatic Arts alumni